The Secret Protocol for the International War on Anarchism, also known as the St. Petersburg Protocol, was an international agreement made on 1904 that arranged national policies for the rendition of anarchists to their origin countries and the exchange of surveilled information on anarchists.

References

References 

 
 
 
 
 
 

1904 treaties
Anti-anarchism
1904 in international relations